Kenneth Jones (2 January 1936 – 18 January 2013) was a Welsh professional footballer. A goalkeeper, he was part of the Wales squad for the 1958 FIFA World Cup in Sweden.

Career

Jones began his career at Cardiff City, developing a reputation for his long goal kicks which would often reach the opposition goal. After losing his place in the first team to Ron Nicholls, he moved to Scunthorpe United in December 1958 where he went on to spend the majority of his career at the club. In 1959, while still a Scunthorpe player, he received a single vote for the Ballon d'Or, the prize for the best footballer in Europe. After leaving the club in 1964, he had spells at Charlton Athletic and Exeter City before moving into non-league with Yeovil Town. During one match for Yeovil in 1968, he was once substituted after conceding 5 goals in 11 minutes.

In November 2009, Jones was honoured with a long service award by the Football Association of Wales.

Jones died at the age of 77 on 18 January 2013, presumably of natural causes.

References

1936 births
2013 deaths
Welsh footballers
Wales under-23 international footballers
Footballers from Aberdare
1958 FIFA World Cup players
Cardiff City F.C. players
Scunthorpe United F.C. players
Charlton Athletic F.C. players
Exeter City F.C. players
Yeovil Town F.C. players
English Football League players
Association football goalkeepers